A Commemoration ball is a formal ball held by one of the colleges of the University of Oxford in the 9th week of Trinity Term, the week after the end of the last Full Term of the academic year, which is known as "Commemoration Week". Commemoration balls are held by different colleges each year, following a cycle by which each college holds a ball every three years.

Commemoration Week is so known because of the ceremonies in commemoration of the benefactors of the university that are held then, namely the Commemoration Day sermon formerly held (until 2006) on the Sunday, and the Encaenia ceremony (where the annual Creweian Oration in honour of benefactors is given) and garden party on the Wednesday of that week. Commemoration Week was formerly one of two occasions when balls were traditionally held, the other being Eights Week, the 5th week of Trinity term when the Summer Eights rowing races occur. Eights balls are nowadays comparatively rare.

Definition

There is no formal definition of a Commemoration ball, but the usual Oxford convention is to refer only to the larger, triennial balls as Commemoration balls. The dress code is usually white tie. Many other colleges hold smaller events during Commemoration Week that they call summer balls or parties rather than Commemoration balls. These are usually held on an annual or irregular basis, and are usually black tie. Merton College holds a triennial winter ball.

Recent and upcoming balls

In the past, Commemoration balls were held "night after night" by different colleges during Commemoration Week. With many colleges now holding smaller annual summer balls, Commemoration balls are now held by only some of the larger colleges, who still follow the traditional triennial cycle. Oriel College hosts a ball in the first year of the three-year cycle, and until recently Magdalen College also did. However Magdalen College cancelled their ball in 2015 at the last minute downgrading to a smaller affair. Currently, in the second year, there are Commemoration balls held by New College and The Queen's College. In the third year, there are now four colleges with this honour (Worcester College, Christ Church, Trinity College, St. John's College).

The 2005 Christ Church Commemoration ball was the first to be held by that college for fifteen years because of an incident at the 1990 ball that led to the Governing Body suspending the ball and replacing it with an annual summer party until 2005. Until 1990 the three great Oxford choral foundations of Magdalen College (first year), New College (second year) and Christ Church (third year) held their "white tie" Commemoration Balls in consecutive years on a triennial basis, each being widely regarded as the most prestigious ball being held in Oxford in that year, but the 1990 incident at Christ Church upset the tradition as various other colleges claimed Christ Church's (third year) slot, and continue to do so after the Christ Church Ball was reinstated in 2005. The cancellation of Magdalen College's (first year) Commemoration Ball in 2015, and its reinstatement in the "New College" (second) year of 2016, completed the break with tradition.

In 2013, Balliol College held a Commemoration ball to mark the 750th Anniversary of the College's foundation, the 2023 Commemoration ball will be only the third Commemoration held at the College since 1969. Similarly, the commemoration ball hosted by Worcester College on 27 June 2014 was the highlight of celebrations to mark the college's tercentenary.

 2003 — Magdalen College
 2004 — New College
 2005 — Trinity College, Worcester College, Christ Church, St. John's College
 2006 — Magdalen College
 2007 — New College
 2008 — Trinity College, Worcester College, Christ Church, St. John's College
 2009 — Magdalen College, Oriel College
 2010 — New College, Wadham College
 2011 — Trinity College, Worcester College, Christ Church, St. John's College
 2012 — Magdalen College, Oriel College
 2013 — New College, Balliol College
 2014 — Trinity College, Worcester College,  Christ Church, St. John's College, Merton College, Exeter College Hertford College
 2015 — Oriel College, Magdalen College (Cancelled)
 2016 — New College, Magdalen College, The Queen's College
 2017  — Trinity College, St John's College, Worcester College, Christ Church, Corpus Christi College
 2018 — Oriel College
 2019 — New College, The Queen's College, Magdalen College (Cancelled again)
 2022 — New College, The Queen's College, Christ Church, Trinity College
 2023 — Balliol College, Magdalen College, Oriel College

Performances

Commemoration ball organising committees generally seek to secure private performances from leading entertainers; some notable performances are listed below.

2022
Example, The Academic, (New College)
Boney M., (The Queen's College)

2019
Everything Everything, (The Queen's College)

2018
Sigma, (Oriel College)

2017
Scouting for Girls, Redlight (Christ Church)
Example (St. John's)
 Izzy Bizu, Tiggs da Author, Clokkemaker (Trinity College)

2016
Chase and Status, VITAMIN, The Electric Swing Circus, (Magdalen College)
Circa Waves, Gentleman's Dub Club, Afriquoi, (New College)

2014
 Laura Mvula, A Skillz, The Oxford Imps,  (Christ Church)
 The Hoosiers, Pendulum, Jigsaw & Dynamite MC, Eliza And The Bear (St John's College)
 Maxïmo Park, Stornoway with Oxford University Sinfonietta, The Correspondents, DJ EZ, Jaymo & Andy George, (Worcester College)
 Clean Bandit, AlunaGeorge, The Correspondents, DJ Heidi, Friend Within (Trinity College)

2013
 Mark Ronson (Balliol College)
 The Fratellis (New College)

2012
 Athlete, Labrinth, Loick Essien, Natty, Roll Deep (Magdalen College)
 The Feeling (Oriel College)

2011
 The Feeling (St John's College)
 Mystery Jets (Worcester College)
 The Streets, Sophie Ellis-Bextor (Trinity College)
 Tinchy Stryder (Christ Church)

2010
 Scouting for Girls (New College)
 Electric Six (Merton College)

2009
 Feeder, The Pipettes (Magdalen College)
 Ladyhawke, Scratch Perverts (Oriel College)

2008
 The Wombats (Christ Church)
 Sugababes, Stornoway (Trinity College)
 One Night Only, Logistics (Worcester College)

2007
 Ash (New College)

2006
 Pharrell, Bodyrockers (Magdalen College)

2005
 Supergrass (Trinity College)

2004
 Dizzee Rascal (New College)

1999
 Coldplay, Jools Holland (Trinity College)
 St Etienne, (New College)

1964
The Rolling Stones (Magdalen College)

See also
 Colleges of the University of Oxford
 May Ball - similar events at the University of Cambridge

References

External links

2018 Balls
Oriel College Commemoration Ball  22 June 2018

2016 Balls
New College Commemoration Ball 25 June 2016
Magdalen College Commemoration Ball 25 June 2016

2015 Balls
Balliol College Ball - Monte Carlo 9 May 2015
Oriel College Commemoration Ball - 26 June 2015
St Hilda's College Ball - Carnevale di Venezia - 9 May 2015

2014 Balls
Worcester College Tercentenary Ball - 27 June 2014
St John's Ball - 27 June 2014
Hertford Bridge of Sighs Ball - 4 October 2014

2013 Balls
Wadham College Ball - 21 June 2013
Balliol College Ball - 21 June 2013
Queen's College Ball - 21 June 2013
New College Ball - 22 June 2013
Merton College Winter Ball - 30 November 2013

2012 Balls
Oriel College Ball - 22 June 2012
Magdalen College Ball - 22 June 2012

2011 Balls
Christ Church Ball - 25 June 2011
Trinity College Ball - 1 July 2011
Worcester College Ball - 1 July 2011
St John's Ball - 1 July 2011

Terminology of the University of Oxford
Culture in Oxford
Balls in the United Kingdom